Warner Alliance was a contemporary Christian record label and a division of Warner Music Group. It was founded in 1989 with headquarters located in San Francisco, California. Artists on the label included Steve Taylor, Kim Boyce, Michael English, the Brooklyn Tabernacle Choir, Caedmon's Call, Sarah Jahn, Donnie McClurkin, First Call, Wayne Watson, Take 6, Ron David Moore,  Marilyn McCoo, Patsy Moore, Mid-South, and The Worldwide Message Tribe. Albums associated with the label are now controlled by Word Entertainment.

History
In 2018, Warner Alliance was acquired by Warner Records, KMG Records, Warner Music Group, Rock 'n Roll Records and Squint Entertainment for US$24million.

See also
 List of record labels

American record labels
Christian record labels
Record labels disestablished in 1998
Warner Music labels
Companies established in 1989
Companies based in San Francisco